Tirathaba pallida is a species of moth of the family Pyralidae. It was described by Whalley in the year 1964. It is found in New Guinea.

References 

Tirathabini
Moths described in 1964